Benamar Meskine (born June 6, 1973) is a boxer from Algeria.

He participated in the 2004 Summer Olympics for his native North African country.  He was defeated in the first round of the welterweight division by Bakhtiyar Artayev.

Meskine qualified for the Athens Games by winning the gold medal at the 1st AIBA African 2004 Olympic Qualifying Tournament in Casablanca, Morocco. In the final of the event he defeated home fighter Ait Hammi Miloud. Meskine won the bronze medal in the same division one year earlier, at the All-Africa Games in Abuja, Nigeria.

References
sports-reference

1973 births
Living people
Welterweight boxers
Boxers at the 2004 Summer Olympics
Olympic boxers of Algeria
Algerian male boxers
Mediterranean Games silver medalists for Algeria
Competitors at the 2001 Mediterranean Games
African Games bronze medalists for Algeria
African Games medalists in boxing
Mediterranean Games medalists in boxing
Competitors at the 2003 All-Africa Games
21st-century Algerian people
20th-century Algerian people